Rinnovu Naziunale is a separatist political party active in Corsica, France.

History
Rinnovu was a member of Corsica Libera between 2008 and 2012.

References

External links
Official website

Political parties in Corsica
Political parties of the French Fifth Republic
Pro-independence parties
Separatism in France